The Oujda Treaty (also known as the Arabic–African Federation Treaty) was signed on 13 August 1984 between King Hassan II of Morocco and Muammar Gaddafi of Libya. It was approved by Moroccan voters in a referendum on 31 August, and by the Libyan General People's Congress. The aim was to establish a "union of states" between the two, and eventually to create a "Great Arab Maghreb".

The treaty startled the administration of US president Ronald Reagan, who pointed out Libya's untrustworthy reputation and called his leader "an instigator of international terrorism". Other western countries like Spain or France also expressed their discomfort.

References

Treaties of the Libyan Arab Jamahiriya
Treaties of Morocco
Treaties concluded in 1984
1984 in Morocco
1984 in Libya
Libya–Morocco relations